West Carleton was a township municipality in Eastern Ontario, Canada. It was located in the rural parts of what is now the City of Ottawa, west of Kanata. Its northern boundary was the Ottawa River.

The township was created in 1974 with the amalgamation of three townships: Torbolton, Fitzroy, and Huntley. In 2001 it was amalgamated with Cumberland, Gloucester, Goulbourn, Kanata, Nepean, Osgoode, Ottawa, Rideau, Rockcliffe Park and Vanier to form the new city of Ottawa.

According to the Canada 2016 Census:
 Population: 21,547
 % Change (2011–2016): +6.2%
 Dwellings: 8,596
 Area (km²): 630.95
 Density (persons per km²): 34.2

Mayors
 1974-1977 Donald B. Munro
 1978-1982 Frank Marchington
 1982-1984 Donald B. Munro
 1984-1990 Eric Craig
 1991-1994 Roland Armitage
 1995-2001 Dwight Eastman

References

1974 establishments in Ontario
Former municipalities now in Ottawa
Former township municipalities in Ontario
Populated places disestablished in 2000